

The CNNA HL-14 was a civil trainer aircraft developed in Brazil during the 1940s at CNNA.  It was a single-engine two-seat airplane.  Only one prototype was constructed.  It did not enter production.

References
Sǎo Paulo Technical Museum website (in Portuguese)

HL-14
1940s Brazilian civil trainer aircraft
Monoplanes
Single-engined tractor aircraft